The Kuala Lumpur–Seremban Expressway   is a main expressway in Kuala Lumpur, Malaysia. This  expressway links Kuala Lumpur in the north to Seremban, Negeri Sembilan in the south.

Some maps label this highway as E2 as it links directly with the North–South Expressway Southern Route; however this appellation is not strictly correct as this particular stretch of road is not managed by PLUS Malaysia Berhad, but rather by ANIH Berhad (formerly known as Metramac Corporation (MetaCorp)). Consequently, the toll rate at Sungai Besi Toll Plaza had included an extra payment to cover the Kuala Lumpur–Seremban Expressway until 2018, when the toll was abolished.

In 2007, the expressway was assigned its own route number of E37 together with Salak Expressway.

Route background
The Kilometre Zero of the expressway starts at the Razak Mansion Interchange while its southern terminus is right before the Sungai Besi toll plaza at the North–South Expressway Southern Route E2. Its final kilometre (KM8.1) is also the final kilometre of the North–South Expressway E2 (KM310.8).

History

The construction of the 63.4 km (39.3 mi) controlled-access expressway from Kuala Lumpur to Seremban began on 27 March 1974 as one of the Second Malaysia Plan (RMK-2) project, with the total cost of RM32.9 million. It consists of 14 interchanges, 2 laybys and 6 toll plaza (Sungai Besi, UPM, Kajang, Bangi, Nilai and Seremban). Funded by a loan by the World Bank, the expressway was constructed in three phases; the first phase was from Kuala Lumpur to Nilai, while the second phase was from Nilai to Seremban. The third phase was the rehabilitation of the old Federal Route 1 from Kuala Lumpur to Seremban as a toll-free alternative to motorists. The expressway was opened to motorists on 16 June 1982, where the Minister of Works at that time, Datuk Seri S. Samy Vellu himself became the first motorist to pay the toll of the expressway. The Kuala Lumpur–Seremban Expressway was the first expressway in Malaysia to implement the closed-toll system in Malaysia.

The RM32.9 million expressway became a pioneer route for the North–South Expressway Southern Route. Initially, the expressway ended at Jalan Seremban–Tampin intersection in Senawang before being extended southwards as part of the North–South Expressway; Exit 220 Senawang Interchange was constructed to divert the expressway through traffic to Ayer Keroh. After the extension of the expressway to Ayer Keroh was completed in 1986, the old Seremban toll plaza at Labu was demolished and was replaced with three toll plazas at Seremban, Port Dickson and Senawang interchanges.

In 1987, the North–South Expressway project was privatised and was taken over by Highway Concessionaires Berhad (now PLUS Expressways Berhad). However, Plus Expressways Berhad only took over the section from Sungai Besi Toll Plaza southwards, leaving the remaining 8.1-km section under the Kuala Lumpur City Hall (DBKL) management until 1992 when the remaining 8.1-km section was upgraded to six lanes by Metramac Corporation Sdn Bhd (MetaCorp), together with the East–West Link Expressway.

On 7 April 2011, MetaCorp changed its name to ANIH Berhad after taking over the operations of toll concession from MTD Prime Sdn Bhd and MetaCorp who respectively owned the concessions for Kuala Lumpur–Karak Expressway, East Coast Expressway Phase 1, and Kuala Lumpur–Seremban Expressway (including East–West Link Expressway) with effect from 6 December 2011.

Today, the name Kuala Lumpur–Seremban Expressway is only applied to the remaining stretch (from Razak Mansion to Sungai Besi toll plaza) managed by ANIH Berhad after PLUS Malaysia Berhad acquired the southern stretch from Sungai Besi toll plaza onwards on 1988 and the Seremban Layby was transformed into a major Rest and Service Area.

Toll rates
The toll collection for the highway at Sungai Besi toll plaza has ceased on June 1, 2018. This is following announcement by the Malaysian Highway Authority, toll concessions for the Kuala Lumpur–Seremban Expressway and Salak Expressway will end.

Toll Road D

List of interchanges

Below is a list of interchanges (exits) and laybys along the Kuala Lumpur–Seremban Expressway. The entire expressway is built as a six-lane divided expressway with the speed limit of 80 km/h and is located within the Federal Territory of Kuala Lumpur.

References

External links
 ANIH Berhad (Formally known as Metramac Corporation Sdn Bhd)

1982 establishments in Malaysia
Expressways in Malaysia
Expressways and highways in the Klang Valley